In control theory, Ackermann's formula is a control system design method for solving the pole allocation problem for invariant-time systems by Jürgen Ackermann. One of the primary problems in control system design is the creation of controllers that will change the dynamics of a system by changing the eigenvalues of the matrix representing the dynamics of the closed-loop system. This is equivalent to changing the poles of the associated transfer function in the case that there is no cancellation of poles and zeros.

State feedback control
Consider a linear continuous-time invariant system with a state-space representation

 

where x is the state vector, u is the input vector, and A, B and C are matrices of compatible dimensions that represent the dynamics of the system. An input-output description of this system is given by the transfer function

Since the denominator of the right equation is given by the characteristic polynomial of A, the poles of G are eigenvalues of A (note that the converse is not necessarily true, since there may be cancellations between terms of the numerator and the denominator). If the system is unstable, or has a slow response or any other characteristic that does not specify the design criteria, it could be advantageous to make changes to it. The matrices A, B and C, however, may represent physical parameters of a system that cannot be altered. Thus, one approach to this problem might be to create a feedback loop with a gain K that will feed the state variable x into the input u.

If the system is controllable, there is always an input  such that any state  can be transferred to any other state . With that in mind, a feedback loop can be added to the system with the control input , such that the new dynamics of the system will be

 

Ackermann's formula

Computing the characteristic polynomial and choosing a suitable feedback matrix can be a challenging task, especially in larger systems. One way to make computations easier is through Ackermann's formula. For simplicity's sake, consider a single input vector with no reference parameter , such as

 

where  is a feedback vector of compatible dimensions. Ackermann's formula states that the design process can be simplified by only computing the following equation:

 

Proof
This proof is based on Encyclopedia of Life Support Systems entry on Pole Placement Control. Assume that the system is controllable.

 

Calculating the powers of  results in

Replacing the previous equations into  yieldsRewriting the above equation as a matrix product and omitting terms that   does not appear isolated yields

From the Cayley–Hamilton theorem, thus

Note that   is the controllability matrix of the system. Since the system is controllable,   is invertible. Thus,

To find , both sides can be multiplied by the vector  giving

Thus,

Example

Consider

We know from the characteristic polynomial of  that the system is unstable since , the matrix  will only have positive eigenvalues. Thus, to stabilize the system we shall put a feedback gain 

From Ackermann's formula, we can find a matrix   that will change the system so that its characteristic equation will be equal to a desired polynomial. Suppose we want .

Thus,  and computing the controllability matrix yields

  and 

Also, we have that 

Finally, from Ackermann's formula

State observer design 
Ackermann's formula can also be used for the design of state observers. Consider the linear discrete-time observed system

 
 

with observer gain L. Then Ackermann's formula for the design of state observers is noted as

 

with observability matrix .

Ackermann's formula can also be applied on continuous-time observed systems.

See also 

 Full state feedback

References

External links 

 Chapter about Ackermann's Formula on Wikibook of Control Systems and Control Engineering

Mathematical concepts
Engineering concepts
Control engineering